F. Dow Smith was president of the Optical Society of America in 1974.

See also
Optical Society of America#Past Presidents of the OSA

References

External links
 Articles Published by early OSA Presidents  Journal of the Optical Society of America

Presidents of Optica (society)
21st-century American physicists
Living people
Year of birth missing (living people)